Jawwad S. Khawaja (born 10 September 1950) is a Pakistani jurist, and former professor of law at the Lahore University of Management Sciences, who served as the 23rd Chief Justice of Pakistan. He was nominated for the position by Prime Minister Nawaz Sharif on 17 August 2015, and approved to take office by President Mamnoon Hussain on the same day.

Early life and education 
Khawaja was born in Wazirabad and was educated at the Mission School in Wazirabad, Lawrence College Ghora Gali near Murree, Aitchison College in Lahore and Forman Christian College University in Lahore. He did his LL.B. at the Punjab University Law College and his LL.M. from the University of California, Berkeley.

Professional career 
He started his legal practice as an advocate of the Lahore High Court in 1975 and was a partner at Cornelius, Lane and Mufti, one of the largest law firms in Pakistan. In 1999, he became a judge of the Lahore High Court but resigned in 2007 in response to the maltreatment of Chief Justice Iftikhar Muhammad Chaudhry on 9 March. He joined the Law and Policy Department of the Lahore University of Management Sciences in August 2007 and served as the head of the department from October 2007 to May 2009 when he joined the Supreme Court of Pakistan.

Important court decisions 
Justice Khawaja was on the bench which decided the Sindh High Court Bar Association case, in which the Court declared the state of emergency imposed by President General Pervez Musharraf on 3 November 2007 to be unconstitutional and restored most of the judges who were forced to vacate office that day. He wrote a concurrent opinion in the case declaring the National Reconciliation Ordinance to be void ab initio, and the leading opinion in the suo motu case ordering wholesale giant Makro-Habib to restore a playground in Jamshed Town on which it had established an outlet.

Justice Khawaja was one of those six judges who gave a dissenting judgement against the military courts in Pakistan, that decision came just few days before his beginning of term as CJP.

Just before finishing his term as CJP, he headed a bench which issued a landmark decision directing Government of Pakistan to adopt Urdu as an official language according to 1973 Constitution. The decision was read out in Urdu by the CJP.

Post-retirement
After retiring as Chief Justice, he went back to LUMS as a scholar-in-residence.

References

Living people
Pakistani judges
Punjabi people
1950 births
Pakistani lawyers
Justices of the Supreme Court of Pakistan
Aitchison College alumni
Punjab University Law College alumni
Academic staff of Lahore University of Management Sciences
Chief justices of Pakistan
People from Wazirabad
Lawrence College Ghora Gali alumni